Femme Fatale:Bae Jeong-ja (요화 배정자 Yohwa Bae Jeongja) is a 1973 South Korean film is based on the life of Bae Jeong-ja (1870–1950), a young Korean orphan adopted by Itō Hirobumi and raised as his daughter. However, she betrays him and her Japanese upbringing after falling in love with a freedom fighter named Hong-Jun.

Cast
 Yoon Jeong-hee as Bae Jeong-ja
 Shin Seong-il as Itō Hirobumi
 Namkoong Won as Hong-jun

See also
 Korea under Japanese rule

External links
 
 

1973 films
South Korean historical films
South Korean drama films
1970s Japanese-language films
Films set in Korea under Japanese rule